Michael Jolley (born 30 March 1977) is an English professional football manager who is the current manager of Vélez.

Jolley is a Cambridge University graduate with an MA in economics and also has a postgraduate diploma PGDip/MSc in sports coaching from the University of Stirling. Jolley holds a UEFA Pro Licence, the highest-level managerial qualification in association football in Europe.

He started coaching in 2004. He has previously held coaching positions at five professional clubs, including Crystal Palace, Nottingham Forest, Lincoln City, Crewe Alexandra and Burnley. After three years as Burnley's U23 head coach, he was appointed manager of AFC Eskilstuna in Sweden, joining the last-placed Allsvenskan club in June 2017. He left the club after it was relegated to Superettan. In March 2018, Jolley became manager at League Two club Grimsby Town.

Early life
Born in Sheffield, Jolley was a youth player with Barnsley between 1989 and 1993. Between 1995 and 1998 Jolley attended Downing College, Cambridge, where he won three 'Blues' for representing Cambridge against Oxford University in the Varsity Football match. During his time at Cambridge Jolley gained a bachelor's degree in economics, which was subsequently converted to a master's degree.

From 1999 to 2005, Jolley was a fixed-income trader, first in London, then in New York; he worked near the World Trade Center at the time of the 11 September 2001 terrorist attacks. In 2002, Jolley returned to England to be nearer to his family, while continuing his work in banking he also moved into football coaching when he joined Crystal Palace in 2004.

Coaching career
Jolley's first coaching position was at Crystal Palace Academy, commencing in 2004, spending three years at Palace, during which time the academy produced players such as Victor Moses and John Bostock. In 2007 Jolley left to take up a position with the academy of Nottingham Forest. After just over one year with Forest, Jolley was appointed high-performance football coach in August 2008 at Stirling University Football Club. Jolley coached and recruited players to the University's football scholarship programme. Stirling also won the Queen's Park Shield in Jolley's first season. Jolley also joined Falkirk as an academy coach. Jolley was also appointed head coach of the Scotland Universities Team in 2008–09. Jolley gained a Postgraduate Diploma PGDip/MSc in Sports Coaching during his time at the University of Stirling. Jolley left his roles at Stirling and Falkirk in 2009.

In 2011 Jolley was one of 16 coaches to participate in the inaugural FA Elite Coaches Award. He then had a brief role as first team coach at Lincoln City of the Conference Premier in 2012. In November 2012, he joined League One side Crewe Alexandra as an Academy coach; his under-16s team included future Crewe professionals Charlie Kirk, Harry Pickering and Callum Ainley. In July 2013 Michael Jolley was one of 16 coaches to complete the FA Elite Coaches Award.

Jolley was appointed senior professional development coach of the Burnley under-23 team on 7 July 2014. Burnley would spend two of the next three seasons in the Premier League (see List of Burnley F.C. seasons). His development squad won the Final Third Development League Cup final with a 2–1 victory over Stoke City U23's in the 2015–16 season. Jolley spent three years in the role, during which time he played a role in the development of Cameron Dummigan, Tom Anderson, Luke Conlan, Luke Hendrie, Ntumba Massanka, Josh Ginnelly, Dan Agyei, Alex Whitmore, and Aiden O'Neill. In 2015, Jolley gained the League Managers Association Diploma in Football Management, which covered influencing and negotiation, mental toughness and resilience, football finance, diversity, equality and inclusion, sport science and performance analytics and focused on leadership, personal development and wellbeing. In 2016, Jolley gained his UEFA Pro Licence, from the English Football Association.

Managerial career

AFC Eskilstuna
Jolley became new manager of Swedish Premier Division, Allsvenskan side, AFC Eskilstuna on 13 June 2017, after being recommended by Sean Dyche. The team was then winless with four points from the opening 12 matches, and bottom of the league table. Under his coaching they took 15 points from the next 16 games, gaining their first Allsvenskan win on 15 July 2017, 2–1 against Kalmar FF in Jolley's first home game in charge, plus wins against IFK Göteborg and Malmö FF; the Malmö victory showcased Jolley's tactical thinking, receiving considerable analysis within the coaching community. A 3-2 defeat by IF Elfsborg in their penultimate home game followed by a 1–1 draw away to Halmstads BK confirmed relegation to Superettan on 23 October 2017, and Jolley left AFC Eskilstuna on 9 January 2018 by mutual consent, unable to agree on the future direction of the club.

Grimsby Town
On 2 March 2018, Jolley was appointed as the new first team manager of EFL League Two side Grimsby Town on an undisclosed rolling contract. His main task for the remainder of the season was to maintain their League Two status; he worked alongside Paul Wilkinson, who continued his previous role as assistant manager. Jolley's first game in charge was a 1–1 draw at home to Port Vale on 10 March 2018.

Jolley secured Grimsby's League status on 28 April 2018 with a 2–1 victory at home to Notts County. The final ten games of the season yielded Grimsby 15 points (four wins and three draws), after a winless run of over 20 games before Jolley took charge and led to his nomination for EFL League Two Manager of the Month for April 2018.

After retaining their EFL League Two status, the 2018–19 season began slowly with only five points and a single win in the opening ten games leading to fears that Grimsby would again be involved in a relegation battle. However, the next ten games were the most productive of Jolley's spell at the club and by Christmas Grimsby were one of the form teams in the Division leading to Jolley winning the EFL League Two Manager of the Month for December 2018 after four consecutive wins.

Further wins in the opening two rounds of the FA Cup against Milton Keynes Dons F.C. and Chesterfield FC saw them pitched against Premier League Crystal Palace FC in the third round. Roared on by over 5500 Mariner's fans only a solitary late goal edged Grimsby out despite them having to play nearly the entire game with ten men after an early red card.

The team's league form suffered again after their cup exit and it wasn't until the final game in January that they picked up their next victory against Milton Keynes Dons F.C. They backed this up with three wins and one draw in February leading to optimistic thoughts of a late bid for the playoffs with Jolley again nominated for EFL League Two Manager of the Month. Their form fell away through March though and it was Easter Monday when they tasted victory again, closing the season out by winning two of the final three games to give a mid-table finish, equally positioned 15 points clear of relegation and 15 points short of the play-offs.

The 2019–20 season began promisingly and by the end of August Grimsby were top goalscorers in League 2 and placed fourth securing Jolley his third EFL League Two Manager of the Month nomination in six months.

EFL Cup victories over Macclesfield Town and League 1 Doncaster Rovers saw the Mariners rewarded with a plum away tie to Chelsea and by the end of September Grimsby Town continued to occupy a play off spot a quarter of the way through the season as they maintained their strong goalscoring form with a 3–1 away win at previously unbeaten Exeter City FC.

However it was announced that Jolley had moved on from the club by mutual consent on 15 November 2019 after only four more league games, a 1–1 draw at home to Newport County AFC in the FA Cup proving to be his final game in charge. Due to postponements his final EFL league match was a goalless draw away to Cambridge United three weeks earlier on 22 October 2019, which saw him leave Grimsby still well in touch with the promotion contenders only one point and two points respectively behind eventual play-off teams Colchester United and Northampton Town and only five points worse off than eventual Champions Swindon Town.

Later it emerged that Jolley's "expletive-laden rant" to a BBC journalist had contributed to his departure after an off-record conversation had been captured on tape in which Jolley complained about excessively negative coverage of the team and swore multiple times.

Barrow 
On 23 December 2020, Jolley was announced as the new manager of EFL League Two side Barrow, signing a two and a half year contract. Jolley was sacked by Barrow on 21 February 2021 after just seven games in the role, with the club occupying 23rd place in League Two. Chairman, Paul Hornby stated that the board and Jolley had a differing vision on how the team should play which ultimately lead to the decision to remove him as manager.

In January 2023, Jolley was appointed manager of Segunda División RFEF side Vélez until the end of the season.

Personal life
Jolley is married to Lizzie since 2013.

Jolley places an emphasis on football being a part of the community and the role he takes in supporting local schools, events and causes, which made him particularly popular with Grimsby Town fans. He auctioned off the Manager of the Month award he received in December 2018 to raise funds for the local Fishermen's Mission.

Jolley was convicted of having sex with a 15-year-old girl after a night out at a Stirling nightclub with friends in 2009. It was established in court that the girl and her friends that accompanied her to the nightclub had lied to Jolley about her true age, telling him that she was 19. The court overwhelmingly accepted, and emphasised in judgement, that Jolley would not have had sex with the girl had he not been deceived over her age. Following their own investigations both the English Football Association and the Scottish Football Association cleared him to continue working with youngsters. In 2018 following complaints to IPSO both the Daily Record and Daily Mail altered their reporting of the incident with MailOnline adding an apology to their article reporting his appointment at Grimsby Town.

Managerial statistics

Honours

Manager
Stirling University
Queen's Park Shield: 2008–09

Burnley U23
Central League Cup: 2015–16

Grimsby Town
Football League Two Manager of the Month: December 2018

References

External links

1977 births
Living people
Footballers from Sheffield
Alumni of Downing College, Cambridge
Alumni of the University of Stirling
Cambridge University A.F.C. players
Expatriate football managers in Sweden
English Football League managers
Crystal Palace F.C. non-playing staff
Falkirk F.C. non-playing staff
Lincoln City F.C. non-playing staff
Crewe Alexandra F.C. non-playing staff
Nottingham Forest F.C. non-playing staff
Burnley F.C. non-playing staff
AFC Eskilstuna managers
Grimsby Town F.C. managers
Association footballers not categorized by position
English footballers
English football managers
People educated at High Storrs School
Barrow A.F.C. managers
English expatriate football managers
Expatriate football managers in Spain
Vélez CF non-playing staff
English expatriate sportspeople in Spain
English expatriate sportspeople in Sweden